The Naqdi dynasty, of Persian origin, were Nawabs who ruled Banganapalle and Chenchelimala from 1769 to 1948: see Second Dynasty of Banganapalle Nawabs. They trace their descent from one Seyyed Mohammad Khan Razavi, who served as Vizier to Shah Safi of Persia in the 17th century.

Rulers

Nawabs of India
Mughal Empire